Raattinam is a 2012 Tamil language romantic drama film, directed by K.S.Thangasamy, starring Laguparan and Swathy. It is produced by S. Madhan and featured music composed by Manu Ramesan. Raattinam is set in the port city which forms the backdrop for his tale on love and its ramifications.

Cast
Laguparan as Jayam 
Swathy as Dhanam
K. S. Thangasamy as Ashok
L. Raja as Dhanam's father

Soundtrack
Soundtrack was composed by Manu Ramesan.
"Asathum Azhagu" — Ajay Sathyan, Manu Ramesan, Naveen Madhav, Srilekha Parthasarathy
"Yeno En Idhayam" — Haricharan, Manu Ramesan, Navin Iyer 
"Yele Yepulla" — Karthik, Manu Ramesan, Chinmayi 
"Yethu Yethu" — Jassie Gift, Manu Ramesan, Anoop Shankar 
"Yenakkulla" — Manu Ramesan, Vidhu Prathap

Critical reception 
Indiaglitz wrote:"Raatinam is a movie that is entertaining and is an honest attempt". Behindwoods wrote:"Raattinam will stay in the minds of those who had struggled to make their love successful and it is not going to leave those who had failed to make their love successful". The Hindu wrote "Raattinam is a film that succeeds in surprising you on more occasions than just one — the biggest surprise coming right at the end, in the form of the climax. To be fair to director K. S. Thangasamy, his story may appear clichéd, but the message he communicates through his film is relatively fresh and one that makes sense."

References 

2012 films
2012 romantic drama films
2010s Tamil-language films
Indian romantic drama films
2012 directorial debut films